Conifer nuts are the edible seeds of conifers, which includes most notably pine nuts (family Pinaceae) and Araucaria nuts (family Araucariaceae).

"Many pine species bear edible nuts: the best known is the Mediterranean stone pine, Pinus pinea. Other nuts that were locally used, and are now traded, include Pinus edulis, in the southeast USA, and P. koraiensis in China. The similar nuts of another conifer, the monkey puzzle tree, Araucaria araucana, are collected in Chile." "Araucaria nuts are most commonly eaten cooked..."

See also
Conifer cone

References

Nuts
Edible nuts and seeds
Broad-concept articles